Colaco or Colaço is a surname. Notable people with the surname include:

Angelo Colaco (born 1989), Indian footballer
Armando Colaco (born 1953), Indian football manager
Bruno Colaço (born 1991), Indian footballer
Jorge Colaço (1868–1942), Portuguese painter
Joseph Colaco, Indian structural engineer
Liston Colaco (born 1998), Indian footballer
Maria Rosa Colaço (1935–2004), Portuguese children's writer and journalist
Nicolau Colaco (born 1984), Indian footballer
Nicole Colaco (born 1970), Canadian field hockey player
 Shay Colaço (born 2005),Goan scholar